Latinity (Latinitas) is proficiency in Latin. The term may also be used to refer to the use of Latinisms or the imitation of Latin style.

References

Latin language